Claremont is a suburban city on the eastern edge of Los Angeles County, California, United States,  east of downtown Los Angeles. It is in the Pomona Valley, at the foothills of the San Gabriel Mountains. As of the 2010 census it had a population of 34,926, and in 2019 the estimated population was 36,266.

Claremont is home to the Claremont Colleges and other educational institutions, and the city is known for its tree-lined streets with numerous historic buildings. Because of this, it is sometimes referred to as "The City of Trees and Ph.Ds." It was named the best suburb in the West by Sunset Magazine in 2016, which described it as a "small city that blends worldly sophistication with small-town appeal." In 2018, Niche rated Claremont as the 17th best place to live in the Los Angeles area out of 658 communities it evaluated, based on crime, cost of living, job opportunities, and local amenities.

The city is primarily residential, with a significant portion of its commercial activity located in "The Village," a popular collection of street-front small stores, boutiques, art galleries, offices, and restaurants adjacent to and west of the Claremont Colleges. The Village was expanded in 2007, adding a controversial multi-use development that includes an indie cinema, a boutique hotel, retail space, offices, and a parking structure on the site of an old citrus packing plant west of Indian Hill Boulevard. Claremont also hosts several large retirement communities.

Claremont has been a winner of the National Arbor Day Association's Tree City USA award for 22 consecutive years. When the city incorporated in 1907, local citizens started what has become the city's tree-planting tradition. Claremont is one of the few remaining places in North America with American Elm trees that have not been exposed to Dutch elm disease. The stately trees line Indian Hill Boulevard in the vicinity of the city's Memorial Park.

History

Claremont was first mapped out by developers in a land boom precipitated by the arrival of transcontinental railroads to Southern California. It was likely named after Claremont, New Hampshire. The early history of the city was closely tied to that of Pomona College, which moved there in 1889. In 1902, a town meeting vote established that east–west streets would be numbered and north–south streets named after colleges and universities. The city was incorporated in 1907.

The citrus groves and open space which once dominated the northern portion of the city have been replaced by residential developments of large homes. Construction of Stone Canyon Preserve, one of the final residential tract developments in the north of the city, commenced in 2003 as part of a complicated agreement between Pomona and the City of Claremont which resulted in the creation of the  Wilderness Park. The foothill area also includes the Padua Hills Theatre (a historic site constructed in 1930) and the Claraboya residential area.

Geography

Claremont is located at the eastern end of Los Angeles County and borders the cities of Upland and Montclair in San Bernardino County, as well as the cities of Pomona and La Verne in Los Angeles County. It is geographically located in the Pomona Valley.

Climate
Claremont has a Mediterranean climate (Köppen climate classification Csa). In the summer months, temperatures may get very hot, sometimes rising above . In the autumn months, Claremont can experience the gusty "Santa Ana Winds", which can bring fire danger to nearby foothill areas. In the winter months, most of the city's annual rainfall occurs, which is typical around the Los Angeles metropolitan area. Snow is rare in Claremont, but can be viewed in the nearby San Gabriel Mountains in winter. In late spring, Claremont can receive many overcast days due to the strong onshore flow from the ocean, this is typically called "May Gray" or "June Gloom" in the region.

Demographics

2010
The 2010 United States Census reported that Claremont had a population of 34,926. The racial makeup of Claremont was 24,666 (70.6%) White (58.9% Non-Hispanic White), 1,651 (4.7%) African American, 172 (0.5%) Native American, 4,564 (13.1%) Asian, 38 (0.1%) Pacific Islander, 2,015 (5.8%) from other races, and 1,820 (5.2%) from two or more races. Hispanic or Latino of any race were 6,919 persons (19.8%).

The Census reported that 29,802 people (85.3% of the population) lived in households, 4,926 (14.1%) lived in non-institutionalized group quarters, and 198 (0.6%) were institutionalized.

There were 11,608 households, out of which 3,576 (30.8%) had children under the age of 18 living in them, 6,305 (54.3%) were opposite-sex married couples living together, 1,223 (10.5%) had a female householder with no husband present, 397 (3.4%) had a male householder with no wife present. There were 429 (3.7%) unmarried opposite-sex partnerships, and 138 (1.2%) same-sex married couples or partnerships. 2,957 households (25.5%) were made up of individuals, and 1,556 (13.4%) had someone living alone who was 65 years of age or older. The average household size was 2.57. There were 7,925 families (68.3% of all households); the average family size was 3.10.

The population was spread out, with 6,459 people (18.5%) under the age of 18, 6,778 people (19.4%) aged 18 to 24, 6,940 people (19.9%) aged 25 to 44, 8,979 people (25.7%) aged 45 to 64, and 5,770 people (16.5%) who were 65 years of age or older. The median age was 38.6 years. For every 100 females, there were 88.4 males. For every 100 females age 18 and over, there were 84.7 males.

The homeowner vacancy rate was 0.9%; the rental vacancy rate was 5.5%. 21,209 people (60.7% of the population) lived in owner-occupied housing units and 8,593 people (24.6%) lived in rental housing units.

During 2009–13, Claremont had a median household income of $87,324, with 7.2% of the population living below the federal poverty line.

2000
As of the census of 2000, there were 33,998 people, 11,281 households, and 7,806 families residing in the city. The population density was 2,586.6 inhabitants per square mile (999.0/km2). The racial makeup of the city was 73.48% White, 15.36% of the population were Hispanic or Latino of any race, 11.51% Asian, 4.98% Black or African American, 0.56% Native American, 0.13% Pacific Islander, 5.20% from other races, and 4.14% from two or more races.

31.3% of households included children under the age of 18. 55.7% were married couples living together, 10.4% had a female householder with no husband present, and 30.8% were non-families. 24.9% of all households were made up of individuals, and 10.6% had someone living alone who was 65 years of age or older. The average household size was 2.56 and the average family size was 3.08.

The population was widely distributed in age, with 20.7% under the age of 18, 18.6% from 18 to 24, 22.8% from 25 to 44, 23.3% from 45 to 64, and 14.6% 65 years of age or older. The median age was 36 years. For every 100 females, there were 88.6 males. For every 100 females age 18 and over, there were 85.1 males.

According to a 2009 estimate, the median household income was $83,342 and the median family income was $107,287. The per capita income for the city was $39,648. About 3.5% of families and 5.4% of individuals were below the poverty line.

Economy

Top employers
According to the city's 2009 Comprehensive Annual Financial Report, the top employers in the city are:

Arts and culture
Claremont has been praised for its vibrant arts and culture scene.

Each year, Claremont holds a springtime folk music festival, hosted by the Folk Music Center Store and Museum. The 35th event took place in May 2018.

Local museums include the Raymond M. Alf Museum of Paleontology at The Webb Schools (the only high school in the United States to own and host a nationally accredited museum on campus) and the Benton Museum of Art at Pomona College.

Each July, Ophelia's Jump Productions presents their annual Midsummer Shakespeare Festival at The Sontag Outdoor Theatre in Pomona College. Productions are performed in repertory with local community and civic events and festivities.

The Claremont Village hosts a Pie Day Festival every March 14. In past years, attendees could collect pie recipes as they walked around downtown Claremont and checked out different stores.

In 2019, Claremont made national news after the Claremont United Methodist Church unveiled a nativity scene depicting Joseph, Mary, and baby Jesus separated and locked up in individual chain-link pens. This was done to reflect the plight of immigrants and asylum seekers on the U.S. Southern Border in 2019. The Church had constructed similarly non-traditional nativity scenes in prior years.

Points of interest

 The Claremont Colleges
 The California Botanic Garden (formerly Rancho Santa Ana Botanic Garden) contains a very large and diverse collection of California native plants, and is open daily for self-guided walking tours.
 Padua Hills Theatre
 Folk Music Center Museum
 Claremont Museum of Art
 Ophelia's Jump Theater
 Benton Museum of Art, Pomona College

Government

In the Los Angeles County Board of Supervisors, Claremont is in the Fifth District, represented by Kathryn Barger.

In the California State Legislature, Claremont is in the 25th Senate District, represented by Anthony Portantino since 2016, and in the 41st Assembly District, represented by Chris Holden since 2012.

In the United States House of Representatives, Claremont is in  following 2022 redistricting. Claremont was previously represented by Republican David Dreier, who served from 1981 to 2013. Claremont was also represented by President Richard Nixon when he was a member of the House of Representatives from 1947 to 1950, prior to his becoming a United States senator.

Education

Public schools
Claremont's school district is known as the Claremont Unified School District (CUSD). It has seven elementary schools, one intermediate school, El Roble, and two high schools, Claremont High School (CHS) and San Antonio High School.

Private schools (non-tertiary) 
The other high school in Claremont is The Webb Schools, a collective name for two private college preparatory schools for grades 9–12, founded by Thompson Webb in 1922. The two schools, officially the Webb School of California (boys' school) and the Vivian Webb School (girls' school), share the same campus in northwest Claremont. The Webb Schools is also home to the Raymond M. Alf Museum of Paleontology, America's only accredited museum located on a high school campus.

Post secondary
Private educational institutions host approximately 6,500 students every year from across the country and around the world. The Claremont Colleges, a consortium of seven schools of higher education, include five undergraduate institutions—Pomona College (founded in 1887), Scripps College (1926), Claremont McKenna College (1946), Harvey Mudd College (1955), and Pitzer College (1963)—and two graduate institutions—Claremont Graduate University (1925) and the Keck Graduate Institute of Applied Life Sciences (1997). Many of these schools are consistently rated among the best in the nation.

Just north of Foothill Boulevard is the college-owned Robert J. Bernard Field Station, which preserves natural coastal sage scrub on its property. The Claremont School of Theology and Claremont Lincoln University, two other schools of higher education, share some resources with the Claremont Colleges, but are separate entities.

Media
The Claremont Courier is widely regarded as Claremont's newspaper of record. In 2018, the Courier was named the top community newspaper in California by the California News Publisher's Association. In addition, Claremont High School’s students produce the student newspaper The Wolfpacket, with support and printing services from the Courier. 

There are also several media outlets based at the Claremont Colleges, including The Student Life, the oldest college newspaper in Southern California, and the radio station KSPC.

Infrastructure

Transportation
Commuter train service to Claremont is provided by Metrolink from the Claremont Metrolink Station. The station is on the San Bernardino Line, with trains traveling to Los Angeles Union Station (west) and San Bernardino – Downtown (east) 19 times on weekdays (20 on Fridays), 10 times on Saturdays, and seven times on Sundays. Claremont's train station is known as the Claremont Depot.

Claremont will also connect with the Metro Gold Line once the Gold Line Foothill Extension is complete in 2026. This extension will also provide service to L.A. Union Station via Pasadena.

FlixBus utilizes a stop adjacent to the Claremont Metrolink Station.

The local transit bus service Foothill Transit covers Claremont and several other cities in the eastern San Gabriel Valley.

Notable people

 Jessica Alba – actress
 Matthew Arias – musician and film editor
 Richard Armour – writer, English professor
 Tony Beltran – soccer player
 Arthur T. Benjamin – mathematician
 Amanda Blake – actress
 Buckethead – musician
 Robert Buckley – actor
 Kori Carter – hurdler
 John B. Cobb – theologian, philosopher, and environmentalist
 Ray Collins – musician
 John Darnielle – musician and novelist
 Glenn Davis – football player
 David Dreier – former member of the U.S. House of Representatives (1981–2013) and chairman of the House Rules Committee (1999–2007, 2011–2013)
 Peter F. Drucker – management consultant, educator and author
 Bob Earl – racing driver
 B. H. Fairchild – poet and college professor
 Justin Germano – baseball pitcher
 Elliot Graham – film editor and producer
 Ben Harper – musician and humanitarian
 Alex Hinshaw – baseball pitcher
 Anastasia Horne – actress and singer
 Raja Kumari – rapper
 Maud Hart Lovelace – author
 Dileep Rao – actor
 Sam Quinones – journalist and author
 Kristin Rossum – murderer
 Millard Sheets - artist and designer
 Paul Soldner – artist
 Noah Song – professional baseball pitcher
 Ruth Suckow – author
 David Foster Wallace – author and professor
 Carleton H. Wright – United States Navy admiral
 Frank Zappa – musician

See also

References

External links

 
 Claremont Chamber of Commerce

 
Cities in Los Angeles County, California
Incorporated cities and towns in California
Pomona Valley
Populated places in the Inland Empire
Populated places established in 1907
1907 establishments in California